Labahitha is a genus of crevice weavers that was first described by S. L. Zonstein, Yuri M. Marusik & I. L. F. Magalhaes in 2017.

Species 
 it contains twelve species:

 Labahitha fuscata (Nakatsudi, 1943) – Japan (Ogasawara Is.), Brunei, Papua New Guinea, Australia (Queensland), New Caledonia, Palau, Marshall Is., Micronesia, Fiji
 Labahitha garciai (Simon, 1892) – Seychelles, Singapore, Malaysia (Borneo), Philippines, Papua New Guinea
 Labahitha gibsonhilli (Savory, 1943) – Australia (Christmas Is.)
 Labahitha incerta Magalhaes, Berry, Koh & Gray, 2022 – Australia (Queensland)
 Labahitha insularis (Thorell, 1891) – India (Nicobar Is.)
 Labahitha littoralis (Roewer, 1938) – Indonesia (New Guinea)
 Labahitha marginata (Kishida, 1936) – Taiwan, Philippines, Papua New Guinea, Pacifi Is. Introduced to Mexico, Central America, Brazil
 Labahitha nicobarensis (Tikader, 1977) – India (Andaman Is., Nicobar Is.)
 Labahitha oonopiformis (Bristowe, 1938) (type) – Malaysia (Peninsula)
 Labahitha platnicki Magalhaes, Berry, Koh & Gray, 2022 – Papua New Guinea (Bismarck Is.), New Caledonia
 Labahitha ryukyuensis (Ono, 2013) – Japan (Ryukyu Is.)
 Labahitha sundaica (Kulczyński, 1908) – Indonesia (Java)

References

External links

Filistatidae